, trading as  (Latin for "energy") is an electric utility with its exclusive operational area of Chūgoku region of Japan. It is the sixth largest by electricity sales among Japan's ten regional power utilities. It operates the Shimane Nuclear Power Plant.

In 1982, Chugoku Electric Power Company proposed building a nuclear power plant near the island of Iwaishima, but many residents opposed the idea, and the island's fishing cooperative voted overwhelmingly against the plans. In January 1983, almost 400 islanders staged a protest march, which was the first of more than 1,000 protests the islanders carried out. Since the Fukushima nuclear disaster in March 2011 there has been wider opposition to construction plans for the plant.

See also

Ashes to Honey
Anti-nuclear movement in Japan

References 

Companies listed on the Tokyo Stock Exchange
Companies based in Hiroshima
Nuclear power companies of Japan
Electric power companies of Japan
Japanese companies established in 1951
Energy companies established in 1951